WWSZ (1420 AM) is a commercial radio station licensed to Decatur, Georgia, and serving the Atlanta metropolitan area. It is owned by JDJ Communications, LLC, and airs a hip hop radio format. The station calls itself "Streetz 94.5, Atlanta's New Hip Hop Station." WWSZ is simulcast on FM translator station 94.5 W233BF in Atlanta, which forms the middle leg of a three-transmitter simulcast of Streetz on 94.5 MHz. The station broadcasts a hip hop music format, with a heavy emphasis on local artists, and is less mainstream than other similar stations in the format such as WHTA and WVEE.

WWSZ broadcasts with 1,000 watts of power during the daytime, and 51 watts at night, using a directional antenna. The radio station is considered a Class D station by the Federal Communications Commission (FCC). The radio station's transmitter is located on North Decatur Road, near Interstate 285 in Scottdale, Georgia.

History

Religious WAVO
1420 kHz in Decatur launched as WAVO on July 19, 1958. Owned by the Great Commission Gospel Association, Inc., it was a 1,000-watt daytime-only outlet, licensed for its first two years to Avondale Estates. Bob Jones University acquired WAVO—and WAVQ (94.9 FM), an Atlanta-licensed FM station that signed on in October 1962—in 1963.

The WAVO stations were sold to their first secular interests when Sudbrink Broadcasting of Georgia acquired them in 1971; Bob Jones sold the pair for $682,750. Four years later, however, Sudbrink bought another Atlanta-area AM outlet and donated WAVO AM to the Bible Broadcasting Network of Norfolk, Virginia. The new owners installed their own Christian format.

WWEV and WATB
BBN first attempted to sell WAVO in late 1988 to the Fiduciary Broadcasting Corporation, controlled by the Thigpen family. That sale failed to materialize, and it would not be until the station was sold in 1992 to the Curriculum Development Foundation, owner of Christian station WWEV-FM 91.5 at Cumming, that BBN shed itself of the facility. The call letters were changed to WWEV, and the AM began to simulcast the contemporary Christian station.

Three years later, the station flipped to gospel music and changed its call letters to WATB. WWEV sold WATB in 1998 to the Freedom Network. Two years later, Freedom sold WATB and stations in other major markets to Multicultural Broadcasting in a $12 million transaction. Under Multicultural, the station aired an eclectic mix of brokered programs, from Christian hip hop shows to Spanish-language coverage of the Atlanta Braves.

On January 28, 2016, the station was granted an FCC construction permit to move to 1430 kHz, increase daytime power to 15,000 watts and increase night power to 158 watts. At night, the antenna pattern would change from directional to nondirectional.

By 2017, the station was airing brokered talk programming under the "Rainbow 1420" name.

Streetz 94.5
On June 23, 2012, W233BF, an FM translator at 94.5 MHz that had previously broadcast a Christian format known as "The Spirit 94.5" and which had moved slowly west from Social Circle to the WUPA tower east of downtown, launched a separate hip hop format as "Streetz 94.5". It was the second time that Steve Hegwood, a former Radio One operations manager, had attempted to start a station in Atlanta with that name. It had briefly appeared at a translator he had bought in 2009 without the company's knowledge; Radio One, which owned WAMJ (107.5 FM), contested, and in a settlement, that company acquired the translator.

The 94.5 translator was wedged in between two unrelated stations: WIPK, broadcasting from Calhoun to the north, and WFDR-FM in Woodbury. Complaints from the latter station prompted W233BF to modify its facility and reduce power.

In 2014 and 2015, Hegwood bought WIPK and WFDR-FM, with the stations flipped to Streetz in January and April, respectively. That October, WIPK broke off from the trimulcast as contemporary hit radio outlet "i94.5"; it returned to Streetz in early 2019.

Since launch, W233BF had been fed by a leased HD Radio subchannel of Entercom-owned WSTR (94.1 FM). However, in late 2017, Entercom acquired competing WVEE (103.3 FM) as part of its purchase of CBS Radio. In order to secure a new originating signal, Hegwood worked with JDJ Communications, which had acquired WATB from Way Broadcasting—a subsidiary of Multicultural—in a $960,000 transaction. On January 30, 2018, WATB became WWSZ, and by April, WWSZ had begun broadcasting Streetz, replacing WSTR as the program source for W233BF.

References

External links
 

WSZ
Radio stations established in 1958
1958 establishments in Georgia (U.S. state)
Urban contemporary radio stations in the United States